The Pastrana Tapestries are four large tapestries commissioned by king Afonso V of Portugal to celebrate the successful conquest of the Moroccan cities of Asilah and Tangier by the Portuguese in 1471. Each measures about 11 by 4 meters (36 by 12 feet), and are made of wool and silk.

The tapestries depict four episodes regarding the conquest of Asilah and Tangier:
 The Landing at Asilah
 The Siege of Asilah
 The Storming of Asilah
 The Capture of Tangier
They feature an impressive array of detailed depictions of Gothic plate armours and weapons such as swords, crossbows, polearms, cannons, and even handcannons, that would have been innovative in the period. 

Their manufacture has been attributed to the workshop of Pasquier Grenier in Tournai, modern-day Belgium. The tapestries are remarkable for being one of the few surviving 15th-century works of weaving depicting contemporary rather than biblical or mythological episodes.  In this they showed the direction for the next three centuries, as sets of tapestries became the grandest form of military art, for example in the set commissioned some 60 years later by Emperor Charles V showing his Tunis campaign, and the English Armada Tapestries 50 years after that. 

The tapestries have been kept at the Colegiada de Pastrana Museum in Pastrana, Spain, since 1664, though it is unknown how exactly they came to Spain.

Gallery

References 

Tapestries
15th century in art